Monte Zucchero is a mountain in the Lepontine Alps of Switzerland. It is located between Bignasco and Sonogno in the canton of Ticino. Reaching a height of 2,735 metres above sea level, Monte Zucchero is the highest summit on the range south of the Passo di Redorta, that separates the Valle Maggia from the Valle Verzasca.

References

External links
 Monte Zucchero on Summitpost
 Monte Zucchero on Hikr

Mountains of the Alps
Mountains of Switzerland
Mountains of Ticino
Lepontine Alps